M A Awal (born 16 March 1968) was the chairman of the Islami Ganatantrik Party. Earlier he served as the secretary general of Bangladesh Tarikat Federation and a Jatiya Sangsad member representing the Lakshmipur-1 constituency during 2014–2018.

Early life
Awal was born on 16 March 1968. He completed his Master of Arts in social science.

Career
Awal was elected to the parliament on 5 January 2014 from Lakshmipur-1 as a Bangladesh Tarikat Federation candidate. On 17 April 2018, he was removed from the post of Secretary General of Bangladesh Tariqat Federation. On 16 September 2018, he led the Bangladesh Tarikat Federation in joining the Islamic Democratic Alliance, an alliance of Islamist parties that support the Bangladesh Awami League government.

On 20 May 2021, Rapid Action Battalion arrested Awal on the allegation of being involved in killing Shahinuddin, a trader in Pallabi neighborhood in Dhaka, over land dispute. Awal was convicted of the murder after the police finding evidence of Awal planning the murder aswell as a phone call from the assilant to Awal saying "Sir Finished."

References

1968 births
Living people
Bangladesh Tarikat Federation politicians
10th Jatiya Sangsad members
Place of birth missing (living people)